Africa Confidential is a fortnightly newsletter covering politics and economics in Africa. It was established in 1960 and is owned by the British company Asempa Limited. Founded by a group of six individuals under the banner of Miramoor Publications, Africa Confidential was originally printed on blue airmail paper and was thus nicknamed "The Blue Sheet". It is available by subscription only.

Africa Confidential focuses on issues that affect the continent, analyses political complexities and reports on areas and topics that receive little coverage in the mainstream press. With its investigations into corruption and political intrigue, the journal punches above its weight and was famously the subject of a record six-year libel case that ended in June 2001. Its Zimbabwe, Kenya, Nigeria and Sudan coverage often makes the news in the mainstream press. Patrick Smith has edited Africa Confidential since 1991. Former editors include Richard Kershaw (1964–1968) and Stephen Ellis (1986–1991).

In 2007, Africa Confidential launched a monthly newsletter called Africa-Asia Confidential.

References 

 Electronic Journals Library (EZB)
 AtoZ electronic journals focused on Africa (NAI)

External links 
 Africa Confidential
 http://ejournals.ebsco.com/Journal2.asp?JournalID=103013
 Wiley Interscience
 Africa-Asia Confidential

Magazines published in London
Newsletters
Magazines established in 1960
1960 establishments in the United Kingdom
Africa-focused media